Dreux is a commune in the Eure-et-Loir department in northern France.

Geography
Dreux lies on the small river Blaise, a tributary of the Eure, about 35 km north of Chartres. Dreux station has rail connections to Argentan, Paris and Granville. The Route nationale 12 (Paris–Rennes) passes north of the town.

History
Dreux was known in ancient times as Durocassium, the capital of the Durocasses Celtic tribe. Despite the legend, its name was not related with Druids. The Romans established here a fortified camp known as Castrum Drocas.

In the Middle Ages, Dreux was the centre of the County of Dreux. The first count of Dreux was Robert, the son of King Louis the Fat.  The first large battle of the French Wars of Religion occurred at Dreux, on 19 December 1562, resulting in a hard-fought victory for the Catholic forces of the duc de Montmorency.

In October 1983, the Front National won 55% of the vote in the second round of elections for the city council of Dreux, in one of its first significant electoral victories.

Population

Sights

Chapelle royale de Dreux

In 1775, the lands of the  comté de Dreux had been given to the Louis Jean Marie de Bourbon, duc de Penthièvre by his cousin Louis XVI. In 1783, the duke sold his domain of Rambouillet to Louis XVI. On 25 November of that year, in a long religious procession, Penthièvre transferred the nine caskets containing the remains of his parents, the Louis-Alexandre de Bourbon, comte de Toulouse and Marie Victoire de Noailles, comtesse de Toulouse, his wife, Marie Thérèse Félicité d'Este, Princess of Modène, and six of their seven children, from the small medieval village church next to the castle in Rambouillet, to the chapel of the Collégiale Saint-Étienne de Dreux. The duc de Penthièvre died in March 1793 and his body was laid to rest in the crypt beside his parents. On 21 November of that same year, in the midst of the French Revolution, a mob desecrated the crypt and threw the ten bodies in a mass grave in the Chanoines cemetery of the Collégiale Saint-Étienne. In 1816, the duc de Penthièvre's daughter, Louise Marie Adélaïde de Bourbon, duchesse d'Orléans, had a new chapel built on the site of the mass grave of the Chanoines cemetery, as the final resting place for her family. In 1830, Louis-Philippe I, King of the French, son of the duchesse d'Orléans, embellished the chapel which was renamed Chapelle royale de Dreux, now the necropolis of the Orléans royal family.

Other sights
Renaissance Château d'Anet
Hôtel de Montulé (16th century)
Pavilion of Louis XVI
Hôtel de Salvat-Duhalde  (18th century)

Personalities
Dreux was the birthplace of: 
Kalifa Cissé, footballer
Martin Pierre d'Alvimare (1772–1839), composer and harpist
Siraba Dembélé, handball player
Abdou Dieye, footballer
Chloe Gosselin, fiancee of magician David Copperfield
Louis Victor Dubois (1837–1914), wine merchant and politician
Rémi Gounelle (1967-), Protestant theologian
Marouan Kechrid, basketball player
Yannick Lesourd, athlete
Antoine Godeau (1605–1672), bishop, poet and exegete. He is now known for his work of criticism Discours de la poésie chrétienne from 1633.
Jean Rotrou (1609–1650), poet and tragedian
Jean-Louis-Auguste Loiseleur-Deslongchamps (1774–1849), botanist
Charles Delescluze (1809–1871), journalist and military commander of the Paris Commune
Issa Samba, footballer
Adrien Trebel (1991-), footballer
Eddie London (1956–), singer
François-André Danican Philidor (1726–1795), musician and chess player
Guerschon Yabusele, basketball player

Twin towns - sister cities
Dreux is twinned with:

 Todi, Italy, since 1960
 Melsungen, Germany, since 1966
 Koudougou, Burkina Faso, since 1972
 Evesham, England, UK, since 1977
 Bautzen, Germany, since 1992
 Almeirim, Portugal, since 2018

See also
Communes of the Eure-et-Loir department

References

External links

 City council website (in French)
 Tourist office website
 Personal website about Dreux (in French)

Communes of Eure-et-Loir
Subprefectures in France